Extinction is an action game developed by Iron Galaxy and published by Maximum Games. The game was released for PlayStation 4, Windows, and Xbox One in 2018. It received a mixed critical reception.

Gameplay

Extinction is an action game. It features similar gameplay to Shadow of the Colossus. It is also partly inspired by the anime series Attack on Titan.

Development and release
Extinction was developed by Iron Galaxy and published by Maximum Games. The game was announced in June 2017 and shown off behind closed doors to members of the press at E3 2017. Extinction was released for PlayStation 4, Windows, and Xbox One on April 10, 2018.

Reception

Extinction received "mixed or average" reviews from professional critic according to review aggregator Metacritic.

The game won the award for "Original Score" at the 9th Hollywood Music in Media Awards.

References

External links
 

2018 video games
Action video games
Iron Galaxy games
PlayStation 4 games
Video games developed in the United States
Xbox One games
Windows games
Maximum Games games